George E. Kimball III (December 20, 1943 – July 6, 2011) was an American author and journalist who spent 25 years as a sports columnist for the Boston Herald before retiring in 2005. Considered one of the foremost boxing writers of his era, he is the author of Four Kings: Leonard, Hagler, Hearns, Duran, and the Last Great Era of Boxing (2008) and "Manly Art: They can run -- but they can't hide" (2011). In collaboration with John Schulian, he edited two anthologies, "At The Fights: American Writers on Boxing" (2011) and "The Fighter Still Remains: A Celebration of Boxing in Poetry and Song from Ali to Zevon" (2010).
Since 1997 he had written the weekly ‘America at Large’ column for The Irish Times in Dublin, Ireland, and had contributed to a number of boxing websites.

Youth and education 
The son of a career Army officer, Kimball was born in Grass Valley, California, but lived all over the world as a boy, including stops in Taiwan and Germany. After graduating from high school in San Antonio, Texas, he attended the University of Kansas, and later the Iowa Writer's Workshop. He became increasingly involved in the counterculture of the late 1960s, and although he had originally attended college on a Naval ROTC scholarship, later in the decade his participation in the antiwar movement led to several arrests.

Early career 
In the late 1960s Kimball (with John Fowler—whose Abington Book Shop was right next to (east of) the Gaslight Tavern on Oread in Lawrence, KS—and Charles Plymell) was an editor for the influential Midwestern magazine Grist before moving to New York, where he was heavily involved in the literary scene revolving around the Poetry Project at St. Mark's-in-the-Bouwerie and the Lion's Head saloon in Greenwich Village. After working at the Scott Meredith Literary Agency in New York, Kimball returned to Kansas in 1970, where he waged a colorful campaign from the Gaslight for the office of Douglas County sheriff. As a freelance writer he contributed to diverse publications such as The Paris Review, Rolling Stone, The Realist, and Scanlan’s Monthly, and his novel, Only Skin Deep, was published in 1968. In the early 1970s he was also an editor for the Cambridge (Mass.) literary journal Ploughshares.

Journalistic career 
In early 1972 Kimball became the sports editor of the Boston Phoenix, and for nearly a decade there worked on a Phoenix staff that at various times included Joe Klein, Jon Landau, Janet Maslin, Curt Raymond, Sidney Blumenthal and David Denby, while nurturing the early careers of fellow sportswriters Mike Lupica, Michael Gee, and Charles P. Pierce. In 1980 he became a columnist for the Herald, and for the next quarter-century covered major sporting events around the world, including Super Bowls and World Series, NBA Finals and the Olympic Games, golf's four majors and Ryder Cups, Wimbledon and the America's Cup yacht races. He covered nearly 400 world title fights, and was the 1985 recipient of the Nat Fleischer Award for Excellence in Boxing Journalism. Kimball also received ‘Best Column’ awards from the Boxing Writers Association of America, the Golf Writers Association of America, Boston Magazine, and United Press International.

Books 
 
   (with Tom Beer)
 Chairman of the Boards, Masters of the Mile—Red Rock Press, Dublin (2008) (with Eamonn Coghlan)
  (introduction by George Foreman)  
  (foreword by Pete Hamill). London/Edinburgh: Mainstream Publishing (July 1, 2008) 
  (with John Schulian)
  (with John Schulian and Colum McCann)
  London/Dublin: Transworld Ireland, 2011.

Anthologies
 The New Olympia Reader
 The World Anthology
 Baseball Diamonds
 Baseball’s Finest
 Come Out Writing
 Impossible Dreams
 A Commonwealth of Golfers
 Rolling Stone Record Review
 Patriots Day

Forewords
 Football’s Blackest Hole by Craig Parker 
 The Regulation of Boxing: a history and comparative analysis of policies among American states by Robert Rodriguez

Broadcast career 
Beginning in the mid-1980s, Kimball served as a regular co-host for several sports talk radio programs in the Boston area, as a television analyst for boxing broadcasts on the Fox SportsNet and Comcast networks, and as a panelist for several PBS programs produced by WGBH-TV. He appeared (as a boxing writer covering a fight between Woody Harrelson and Antonio Banderas) in Ron Shelton's 1999 film “Play it to the Bone.”

Family 
In a ceremony officiated by former heavyweight champion George Foreman, Kimball married New York psychiatrist Marge Marash in 2004.  The couple lived in New York City.  He had two children, Darcy Maeve Kimball of Denver, Colorado and George E. Kimball IV of Brooklyn, New York, stepsons Kim, Chris, and Jeremy Seeger, and four grandchildren.

Kimball was diagnosed with cancer in 2005, and died from the disease in 2011 at age 67.

Editorial reviews 
Product Description

Roberto Duran, Marvelous Marvin Hagler, Sugar Ray Leonard, and Thomas "Hit Man" Hearns all formed the pantheon of boxing greats during the late 1970s and early 1980s—before the pay-per-view model, when prize fights were telecast on network television and still captured the nation's attention. Championship bouts during this era were replete with revenge and fury, often pitting one of these storied fighters against another. From training camps to locker rooms, author George Kimball was there to cover every body shot, uppercut, and TKO. Inside stories full of drama, sacrifice, fear, and pain make up this treasury of boxing tales brought to life by one of the sport's greatest writers.

About the Author

George Kimball spent 25 years as a sports columnist for the Boston Herald and in 1986 received the Nat Fleischer Award for Excellence in Boxing Journalism. He has covered more than 350 title bouts, and is the author of Only Skin Deep and Sunday's Fools. He lives in New York City.

RE: NAT FLEISCHER AWARD:

http://boxing.about.com/library/bl_bwaa_fleischer.htm

RE: PLOUGHSHARES

http://www.pshares.org/authors/author-detail.cfm?authorID=1899

RE: GRIST:

https://web.archive.org/web/20081117052816/http://www.etext.org/Poetry/Grist/gol_1.asc

Any reference to the original GRIST would be incomplete if there were no indication of the contribution made by co-editors George Kimball and Charlie Plymell. For many issues they were, in fact, the editors, while I acted as publisher (from the thin bankroll of the Abington Book Shop which was too soon exhausted). They sought out authors, gathered material, traveled, wrote letters, made phone calls, cajoled subscribers, designed, laid out, typed, printed, collated, stapled, stamped and delivered. (John Fowler)

References

Secondsout.com article by Thomas Hauser

Thesweetscience.com bio
Kimball family genealogy
Death notice

External links 
Official site
Contributions and mentions in ESPN
Facebook
Sweet Science Article
George Kimball at Beats In Kansas

University of Kansas alumni
1943 births
2011 deaths
People from Grass Valley, California
Journalists from California